Pele FC is a Guyanese football club based in Georgetown, competing in the GFF Elite League, the top tier of Guyanese football. The club was founded in 1971 and is named after Brazilian football legend Pelé.

Honors

League titles 
 Guyana National Football League
 Runners-up (2): 1995–96, 2012–13
 Georgetown region championships
 Champions (8): 1976, 1977, 1978, Unknown*, 1988–89, 1989, 1991, 1996
*One other championship between 1980 and 1985

Cups 
 Guyana Mayors Cup
 Winners (3): 2004–05, 2006–07, 2008–09
 Runners-up (1): 2002–03
 Kashif & Shanghai Cup
 Winners (1): 2008–09
 Runners-up (4): 1996–97, 1997–98, 2010–11, 2011–12
 Sweet 16 Knockout Tournament
 Winners (1): 2004
 NaMilCo Cup
 Winners (1): 2006
 Runners-up (1): 2005–06
 Brazilian Challenge Cup
 Winners (1): 1973

Performance in CONCACAF competitions 
Pele's score listed first, as well as the home leg.

1977 CONCACAF Champions' Cup
First Round v.  Voorwaarts — 2–0, 1–4

1978 CONCACAF Champions' Cup
First Round v.  Racing CH — 3–1, 2–1
Second Round v.  Voorwaarts — 1–0, 1–5

See also 
Football in Guyana
GFF Elite League

References

External links
 

Football clubs in Guyana
1971 establishments in Guyana
Association football clubs established in 1971
Things named after Pelé